Francisco Javier Araujo Fernández (born 17 May 1973), also known as Paco Araujo, is a Spanish futsal manager and former player. As a player, he played for FC Barcelona Futsal.

Club career 
Araujo has played for FC Barcelona, Martorell, Cartagena, Burela, and El Pozo de Murcia.

Managerial career 
As a manager, Araujo coached Can Tito Vilanova in Spain, Sharks and Stellamigo Iwate Hanamaki in Japan, Győri ETO in Hungary, and the Lebanon national team, whom he coached at the 2016 AFC Futsal Championship. He has also coached Paraiso in Costarica, as well as the Costa Rica national team.

On 16 February 2018, Araujo was appointed head coach of Futsal Club Toronto, a team in the Futsal Canadian Championship. On 28 September 2020, Araujo was re-appointed head coach of the Lebanon national futsal team, to coach them at the 2020 AFC Futsal Championship.

Personal life 
Born on 17 May 1973 in Barcelona, Spain, Araujo is married to Mery Sanchez and has two children: Uriel and Alexia.

Career statistics

Club

Managerial

References

Spanish men's futsal players
Living people
1973 births
FC Barcelona Futsal players
FS Martorell players
FS Cartagena players
Spanish futsal coaches
Spanish expatriate sportspeople in Lebanon